Boeber is the Cape Malay name for a South African pudding. It has become a traditional Cape Malay sweet, milk drink, made with vermicelli, sago, sugar, and flavoured with cardamom, stick cinnamon, and rose water. The pudding is traditionally served on the 15th night of Ramadan to celebrate the middle of the fast, for those who have completed the first 15 days of fasting.

Origin 
In South Africa, boeber was originally made by Cape Malays, whose ancestors came from Indonesia, East Africa, and India. Malaysians consume a similar delicacy called bubur lambuk (special porridge) to break their fast in Ramadan. A similar drink called Sawine or Sewine is served in Trinidad and Tobago homes on Eid al-Fitr (the festival marking the end of Ramadan). Globally, there are similar drinks such as Asian kheer and sweet congee. Boeber bears the closest resemblance to kheer or payasam, a dessert hailing from the Indian subcontinent, which is likely to be either introduced by Indian slaves, or the 1860 Indentured Indian immigrants. In South Africa, an Afrikaans dish known as melkkos is similar to boeber.

Many people make boeber according to family recipes, and most Cape Malay cookbooks feature recipes and pictures of the boeber delicacy. In addition, a boeber mix is available in selected supermarkets, corner cafes, and spice shops in South Africa.

Ingredients 
  butter
  sago
 1 cup of water to soak the sago
  vermicelli
 3 cinnamon sticks
 5 whole cardamom (bruised)
  sultanas
  milk
  rose water 
  white sugar (to taste)
  blanched almonds

Preparation 
Pre-soak the sago in the water for 15 minutes. Melt the butter in a deep saucepan. Add the vermicelli and toss it in the butter with a fork until the vermicelli is lightly browned. Add the cardamom, cinnamon and the sultanas, and stir. Pour in the milk and bring to the boil. Add the sago and simmer for 30 minutes or until sago is transparent, stirring constantly to prevent sticking of the ingredients to the saucepan. Add the rose water, sugar and almonds, and continue to simmer until well blended for 10 minutes. Serve hot. Makes 8 to 10 servings. Preparation time: 1 hour.

References  
Smith S. Cape Malay Cooking & Other Delights. 2015, p. 106.
Field S, Meyer R, Swanson F. Imagining the City : memories and cultures in Cape Town. HSRC Press, 2007, p. 126.
Baderoon G. Representation of Islam in South African media and culture. University of Cape Town, 2014, p. 113

South African cuisine